Ramanal is a village in Dharwad district of Karnataka, India.

Demographics 
As of the 2011 Census of India there were 280 households in Ramanal and a total population of 1,436 consisting of 748 males and 688 females. There were 202 children ages 0-6.

References

Villages in Dharwad district